Kanpei-taisha
, once called , is a Shinto shrine in the Gion District of Kyoto, Japan. Situated at the east end of Shijō-dōri (Fourth Avenue), the shrine includes several buildings, including gates, a main hall and a stage. The Yasaka shrine is dedicated to Susanoo as its chief kami, with his consort Kushinadahime on the east, and eight offspring deities (yahashira no mikogami) on the west. The yahashira no mikogami include Yashimajinumi no kami, Itakeru no kami, Ōyatsuhime no kami, Tsumatsuhime no kami, Ōtoshi no kami, Ukanomitama no kami, Ōyatsuhiko no kami, and Suseribime no mikoto.

History
Initial construction on the Shrine began in 656. The Shrine became the object of Imperial patronage during the early Heian period.  In 965, Emperor Murakami ordered that Imperial messengers be sent to report important events to the guardian kami of Japan. These heihaku were initially presented to 16 shrines; and in 991, Emperor Ichijō added three more shrines to Murakami's list.  Three years later in 994, Ichijō refined the scope of that composite list by adding Umenomiya Shrine and Gion Shrine.

Beppyo shrines

Matsuri
In the year 869, a terrible epidemic caused the Emperor to call for a Shinto ritual to appease vengeful spirits believed to be the cause. Representatives used 66 pikes (hoko or 鉾) for each of 66 regions in the country at that time, in a Shinto ritual called goryo-e（御霊会）at Shinsenen, a lake at the Imperial Palace at that time. Eventually, the ritual became an annual event known as the Gion Goryo-e, and then the Gion Matsuri, associated with Gion Shrine, in the Gion district of Kyoto. The pikes became decorated, larger, and eventually morphed into the famous Gion Matsuri yamaboko (山鉾) floats. These travel through the central streets of Kyoto, as do mikoshi (portable shrines) from Yasaka Shrine, to purify the streets and ward off any potential epidemics or other harm. The Gion Matsuri takes place every July, and has become world famous.

Today, in addition to hosting the Gion Matsuri, Yasaka Shrine welcomes thousands of people every New Year, for traditional Japanese New Year rituals and celebrations. In April, the crowds pass through the temple on their way to Maruyama Park, a popular hanami (cherry blossom viewing) site. Lanterns decorate the stage with the names of festival sponsors.

Gallery

See also
 List of Shinto shrines
 Twenty-Two Shrines
 Modern system of ranked Shinto Shrines

Notes

References

 Breen, John and Mark Teeuwen. (2000).  Shinto in History: Ways of the Kami. Honolulu: University of Hawaii Press. 
 Ponsonby-Fane, Richard. (1962).   Studies in Shinto and Shrines. Kyoto: Ponsonby Memorial Society. OCLC 399449
 . (1959).  The Imperial House of Japan. Kyoto: Ponsonby Memorial Society. OCLC 194887

 

7th-century establishments in Japan
Important Cultural Properties of Japan
Religious organizations established in the 7th century
Shinbutsu bunri
Shinto shrines in Kyoto
Religious buildings and structures completed in 656
Gion faith